Sri Vyshnavi Yarlagadda (born 6 December 1995) is an International Grandmaster of Memory. She attained her career-best rank no. 2 in October 2013 in Names and Faces event by the World Memory Sports Council. She is the first Indian to win an open category medal at the World Memory Championships. She achieved this feat by winning the gold medal in Names and Faces event at the 20th World Memory Championship 2011 on 7 December 2011 in Guangzhou, China.

She is the first Indian to set a Junior World Record and also the first Indian woman to win a gold medal in World Junior Memory Championships. She completed a hat-trick in 2012 by winning the gold medal on 14 December 2012 at the World Memory championship in London. She is the youngest and the first woman in India to achieve the International Master of Memory title. She was honored by the President of India, Shri. Pranab Mukherjee as one of the top 100 women achievers of India on 22 January 2016 at Rashtrapathi Bhawan. She was one of the five sportsperson to have won the award.

Early life 
Sri Vyshnavi completed her schooling in Hyderabad. She is a psychology graduate from Osmania University. She played Chess and won state championships. Her family hails from Vijayawada.

Records

World Records 

All the above records were set at competitions affiliated to the World Memory Sports Council.

National Records 

All the above records were set at competitions affiliated to the World Memory Sports Council.

Titles 
 International Master of Memory - 2015
 International Grandmaster of Memory - 2017

Awards

Medal Records

2010

2011

2012

2013

2014

2015

2016

2017

2018

2019

See also 

Sports
 Memory sport
 Method of loci
 Mind sport
 Mind Sports Olympiad (MSO)
 World Memory Championships

Sports person
 Ben Pridmore
 Dominic O'Brien
 Rajan Mahadevan
 Grand Master of Memory
 List of world championships in mind sports

Misc
 Mnemonist
 Mnemonic major system

References

External links 
 WMSC profile
 Official World Memory Championships website
 

1995 births
Living people
Sportswomen from Hyderabad, India
Sportswomen from Vijayawada, India
Indian mnemonists
21st-century Indian women
21st-century Indian people